Miloňovice is a municipality and village in Strakonice District in the South Bohemian Region of the Czech Republic. It has about 300 inhabitants.

Administrative parts
The village of Sudkovice and the hamlet of Nová Ves are administrative parts of Miloňovice.

References

Villages in Strakonice District